Chorlton may refer to:

Places
Chorlton, Cheshire East, in Cheshire, England
Chorlton, Cheshire West and Chester, in Cheshire, England
Chorlton-cum-Hardy, in Manchester, England
Chorlton (ward), an electoral ward of Manchester, England
Chorlton Park (ward), an area and electoral ward of Manchester, England
Chorlton-on-Medlock, in Manchester, England
Chapel and Hill Chorlton, part of Newcastle-under-Lyme Rural District, in Staffordshire, England

People with the surname 
 Harold Chorlton (1898–1967), British trade unionist and politician
 Michael C. Chorlton (1913–1951), English film editor and director
 Tom Chorlton (1880–1948), English footballer who played for Liverpool F.C.

Fictional characters
The protagonist of Chorlton and the Wheelies, a British children's animated television series

English-language surnames